The Servant Girl Annihilator, also known as the Austin Axe Murderer and the Midnight Assassin, was an unidentified American serial killer who preyed upon the city of Austin, Texas, between 1884 and 1885. The sobriquet originated with the writer O. Henry. The series of eight axe murders were referred to by contemporary sources as the Servant Girl Murders.

The December 26, 1885, issue of The New York Times reported that the "murders were committed by some cunning madman, who is insane on the subject of killing women." The murders represent an early example of a serial killer operating in the United States, three years before the Jack the Ripper murders in Whitechapel.

According to author Philip Sugden in The Complete History of Jack the Ripper, the conjecture that the Texas killer and Jack the Ripper were one and the same man originated in October 1888, when an editor with the Atlanta Constitution proposed this conjecture, following the murders of Elizabeth Stride and Catherine Eddowes by Jack the Ripper.

Murders

According to Texas Monthly, the killer murdered seven women (five black, two white) and one black man. Additionally, the killer seriously injured six women and two men.

All the victims were attacked indoors while asleep in their beds. Five of the women were dragged, unconscious but still alive, and killed outdoors. Three of the women were severely mutilated while outdoors.

All the victims were posed in a similar manner. Six of the murdered women had a "sharp object" inserted into their ears.

The series of murders ended with the killing of two white women, Eula Phillips, age 17, and Susan Hancock, who was attacked while sleeping in the bed of her 16-year-old daughter on the night of 24 December 1885.

Only one of those arrested, James Phillips, was convicted. He was found guilty of murdering his wife but the conviction was later overturned.

London authorities questioned several American cowboys, one of whom (according to the authors of Jack the Ripper, A to Z) was possibly Buck Taylor, a performer in Buffalo Bill's Wild West Show. Taylor was born in Fredericksburg, Texas, about 70 miles west of Austin.

According to a front-page article in The New York Times of December 26, 1885, 400 men were arrested during the course of the year. According to the Texas Monthly, powerful elected officials refused to believe that one man, or one group of men, was responsible for all the murders.

The African-American community and some practitioners of voodoo believed the killer was a white man who had magic powers that enabled him to become invisible, as no dogs outside or in fenced-yards adjacent to locations where murders occurred were heard to bark or raise any alarm.

The series of murders stopped when additional police officers were hired, rewards were offered and citizens formed a vigilance committee to patrol the streets at night. Contemporary newspapers reported that the murderer(s) had apparently fled the area, as no more murders were officially attributed to the killer by the authorities.

Victims
 Mollie Smith, 25, was murdered the night of 30 December 1884. Walter Spencer was seriously wounded.
 Clara Strand and Christine Martenson, two Swedish servant girls, were seriously wounded the night of 19 March 1885.
 Eliza Shelly was murdered the night of 6 May 1885.
 Irene Cross murdered by a man with a knife on the night of 22 May 1885.
 Clara Dick was seriously wounded in August 1885.
 Mary Ramey, 11, was murdered the night of 30 August 1885. Her mother, Rebecca Ramey was seriously wounded.
 Gracie Vance and her boyfriend, Orange Washington, were murdered on the night of 28 September 1885.
 Susan Hancock was murdered the night of 24 December 1885.
 Eula Phillips was murdered the night of 24 December 1885.

Eyewitness accounts
According to a July 2000 article in the Texas Monthly, there was an eyewitness who claimed to have seen the murderer, but reported contradictory information to the police.

The killer was variously reported to have been white or dark-complexioned; or a "yellow man" wearing lampblack to conceal his skin color; or a man wearing a Mother Hubbard style dress; or a man wearing a slouch hat; or a man wearing a hat and a white rag that covered the lower part of his face.

There were also reports that the killer worked with an accomplice, or belonged to a gang of murderers.

Nathan Elgin
On July 15, 2014, the PBS TV show History Detectives aired an episode on the killings.  Using a combination of historical research and modern techniques, including psychological and geographic profiling, they identified a suspect: Nathan Elgin, a 19-year-old African-American cook.

Elgin worked in close proximity to the crime scenes and was missing his little toe, which was similar to a footprint believed to have been left by the killer. In February 1886, shortly after the last murder, Elgin was shot and killed by police while he was attempting to assault a girl with a knife.

In popular culture
William Sydney Porter, better known as the short story writer O. Henry, was living in Austin at the time of the murders. Porter coined the term "Servant Girl Annihilators" in a May 10, 1885, letter addressed to his friend Dave Hall and later included in his anthology Rolling Stones: "Town is fearfully dull," wrote Porter, "except for the frequent raids of the Servant Girl Annihilators, who make things lively in the dull hours of the night...." However, no contemporary newspaper or published source referred to the murderer(s) as "The Servant Girl Annihilator".

In 2000, Steven Saylor published the novel A Twist at the End, which closely reconstructed the murders and the ensuing trials, with young William Sydney Porter playing a fictional role. The novel was published in the United Kingdom (as Honour the Dead) and has been translated into Portuguese and Hungarian.

Episode 6 (2015) of the podcast Tanis, a mystery/suspense docudrama, is titled "The Servant Girl Annihilator". It suggests a connection between the killings and the mysteries central to the podcast's ongoing story.

In 2022, The Drag Audio Production House published a four-part podcast, "Devilish Deeds", a nonfiction series about the murders. It explored the victims' deaths and the theories surrounding the killer or killers.

See also
List of fugitives from justice who disappeared
List of serial killers in the United States

Cited works and further reading

References

External links
 
 The Servant Girl Annihilator - Nathan Elgin - A Criminology
Macabre Monday The Case of the Servant Girl Annihilator

1884 in Texas
1884 murders in the United States
1885 in Texas
1885 murders in the United States
19th-century American criminals
American murderers of children
American serial killers
Axe murder
Crimes in Austin, Texas
Fugitives wanted by the United States
History of Austin, Texas
Male serial killers
Murder in Texas
Murder in the United States
Stabbing attacks in the United States
Unidentified serial killers
Unsolved murders in the United States
History of women in Texas